Pleasant Valley Wine Company, also known as Great Western Winery, is a historic winery complex located in the Hamlet of Rheims in the Town of Urbana in Steuben County, New York. The complex consists of nine historic buildings constructed of fieldstone. The five oldest structures were built in the 1860s and are in the Italianate style. It was listed on the National Register of Historic Places in 1980.

The winery has the largest plantings of Chardonnay and Riesling in New York.

History
Established on March 15, 1860 by Charles Champlin and 12 other investors, the winery is the first bonded winery in the United States; bonded winery #1. The winery produced Isabella and Catawba initially, expanding into sparkling wine production in 1865, earning the Pleasant Valley the nickname "the Reims of America." The on-site post office used the postmark "Reims, NY" until 1945.

During Prohibition, the winery survived by making sacramental and medicinal wines. After Repeal, the winery was sold several times, including the Taylor Wine Company in 1961, and inclusion in the sale of Taylor to Coca-Cola in 1977. Coke sold the winery to Joseph E. Seagram & Sons in 1983, which sold the winery to Vintners International in 1987. In 1995, the winery was purchased by the Doyle family.

Gallery

References

External links
Pleasant Valley Wine Company - Great Western Champagne, Finger Lakes Wine website

Wineries in New York (state)
Agricultural buildings and structures on the National Register of Historic Places in New York (state)
Agricultural buildings and structures on the National Register of Historic Places
Italianate architecture in New York (state)
Buildings and structures in Steuben County, New York
National Register of Historic Places in Steuben County, New York
Food and drink companies established in 1860
American companies established in 1860